The Chief Justice of the Supreme Court of Indonesia is the head of the Supreme Court of Indonesia.

Election process
The chief justice and his or her deputy is elected by the Supreme Court justices from among the members of the court. Sometimes the process is controversial and attracts public criticism. For example, in early 2012 rumours about vote buying were reported in the Jakarta press as speculation mounted about the arrangements underway for the selection of new chief justice to replace Harifin Tumpa, who retired as chief justice in March 2012. It was said to be "all-out competition" for the post of chief justice because of the influence that the position holds and it was rumoured that the competition might include payments.

List of Chief Justices

See also
 Chief Justice of the Constitutional Court of Indonesia

References

 
Supreme Court of Indonesia